Sukant Indukant Kadam (born 9 May 1993) is an Indian professional para-badminton player. Having made his international debut in 2014, he became world number 2 in the SL4 category on 12 June 2017. He won his first title at the Uganda Para-Badminton International in 2017. He currently lives in Pune, Maharashtra.

Early life and training 

Kadam was born and brought up in Kautholi which is a small town of Sangli, Maharashtra. He came to Pune for his study at Government College Of Engineering And Research, Avasari Khurd in mechanical engineering and passed out in 2015 with first class. Afterwards, he joined Nikhil Kanetkar Badminton Academy and trained under Nikhil Kanetkar and Mayank Gole since July 2015.

Start of para-badminton 

During Kadam's first year of mechanical engineering in January 2011 in Government College Of Engineering And Research, Avasari Khurd where he was rejected from the class team because of his slow movement. After a year of practice and hard work, he got a chance to play on his college team. In 2012, para-athlete Girisha Nagarajegowda won silver in high jump (F42) at the 2012 Summer Paralympics. This is how Kadam got to know about Paralympic sports and Para-badminton. He made his debut at the England Para Badminton International 2014.

Awards

Career 

 Bronze medal at the BWF Para Badminton World Championships  2019
 Gold medal at the IWAS World Games  2019
 Bronze medal at the Asian Para Games  2018
 Bronze medal in MD SL3-SL4 at the Para-Badminton Asian Championships 2016

Achievements

World Championships 
Men's singles

IWAS World Games 
Men's singles

Men's doubles

Asian Championship 
Men's doubles

BWF Para Badminton World Circuit (3 titles, 5 runners-up) 
The BWF Para Badminton World Circuit – Grade 2, Level 1, 2 and 3 tournaments has been sanctioned by the Badminton World Federation from 2022.

Men's singles

Men's doubles

International Tournaments (7 titles, 14 runners-up) 
Men's singles

Men's doubles

Doubles

Medals

International medals

* Statistics were last updated on 24 March 2020.

Personal life 
Sukant Kadam was employed with Nikhil Kanetkar Badminton Academy from July 2015 as an assistant coach, until August 2018. Following his bronze-medal win at the Asian Para Badminton Championship 2016, he was also appointed as a Taluka Sports Officer (Group-II) by the Government of Maharashtra on 10 January 2019.

See also 

 Olympic Gold Quest

References

Notes 

1993 births
Living people
Paralympic athletes of India
Indian disabled sportspeople
Indian male badminton players
Racket sportspeople from Pune
Marathi sportspeople
Disabled
Sports
Indian male para-badminton players